Charalambos "Babis" Stefanidis (born 8 March 1981) is a Swedish former professional footballer who played as a midfielder, and now manager. He is the current manager of the Swedish team Olympiacos Stockholm FC.

Career 
Born in Skellefteå, Stefanidis started his career at youth level at IF Brommapojkarna and has also represented the Greek team Iraklis. He got his senior level debut for Djurgårdens IF in 2001, and won the Swedish Allsvenskan championship with the club in 2002 and 2003. In 2004, he moved abroad to play for Danish club Brøndby IF, with whom he won the 2005 Danish Superliga championship. He moved back to Sweden in 2005 in order to join Helsingborgs IF.

On 23 July 2007, it was announced that Stefanidis had signed for Helsingborgs' rivals Malmö FF, a contract starting on 1 January 2008. However, fans of Helsingborgs IF were greatly upset and subsequent harassment and personal persecution led to Stefanidis' changing clubs prematurely, on 2 August 2007. The disappointment came from the fact that Stefanidis refused to sign a new contract with Helsingborg and thereafter switched to the main rivals.

On 27 July 2009, Stefanidis moved on loan from Malmö FF to Landskrona BoIS, in exchange for Ivo Pekalski who moved from Landskrona to Malmö. In the Winter 2009, Stefanidis moved back to play for his childhood club IF Brommapojkarna.

In February 2012, Stefanidis joined Akropolis IF in the Division 1 Norra.

Honours 

 Djurgårdens IF
 Allsvenskan: 2002, 2003
 Svenska Cupen: 2002

 Brøndby IF
 Danish Superliga: 2004–05
 Danish Cup: 2005

 Helsingborgs IF
 Svenska Cupen: 2006

References

External links 
 Malmö FF Profile
 Brøndby IF profile

1981 births
Living people
Swedish people of Greek descent
Swedish footballers
Sweden under-21 international footballers
Super League Greece players
Allsvenskan players
Danish Superliga players
Djurgårdens IF Fotboll players
Brøndby IF players
Helsingborgs IF players
Landskrona BoIS players
Akropolis IF players
Malmö FF players
Iraklis Thessaloniki F.C. players
IF Brommapojkarna players
Swedish expatriate footballers
Expatriate men's footballers in Denmark
Expatriate footballers in Greece
Association football midfielders
People from Skellefteå Municipality
Sportspeople from Västerbotten County